Craig Dalrymple is an English former footballer and the currently serves as Inter Miami CF's academy director.

Career
Dalrymple was born in Melton Mowbray, Leicestershire, England. Darylmple began his career was a midfielder with Ipswich Town's academy. Craig went on to spend six years with the Tractor Boys without making a first team appearance.

Following his time at Ipswich, Craig went on to play for a number of clubs and institutions including a stint with the Vancouver Whitecaps in their previous incarnation as the Vancouver 86ers.

Coaching career

25 September 2018, Dalrymple was announced as interim head coach of the Vancouver Whitecaps.

Before rejoining the Whitecaps, Darlymple held a number of technical, coaching and scouting positions within the game.

Dalrymple was promoted to the Technical Director of the Vancouver Whitecaps FC Residency in January 2014 after serving many roles within the MLS club including U15, U16, U18, U23 head coach, head of player development, assistant Technical Director, and head of recruitment.

Prior to joining the Whitecaps FC Darlymple's spent a one-year stint as a youth coach with Portsmouth working with the academy players, and 10 years as technical director of Surrey United Soccer Club in Surrey, British Columbia.

Dalrymple is a fully licensed coach holding several coaching 'badges' include the UEFA Pro License from the English FA, 'A'-level licence certification from the UEFA, the USSF and the CSA. He also holds the Academy Directors Licence from the English FA, and was most recently one of only 20 MLS coaches that completed the French Football Federation Elite Formation Coaching Licence.

In 2007, Dalrymple was also employed in the role of scout for the Canadian U-20 soccer team. Dalrymple began at the Vancouver Whitecaps in May 2010. Dalrymple was the Whitecaps Residency head coach in the 2010 USL Premier Development League campaign, succeeding interim head coach Colin Miller.

References

English footballers
Living people
Sportspeople from Melton Mowbray
Footballers from Leicestershire
Ipswich Town F.C. players
Vancouver Whitecaps (1986–2010) players
Vancouver Whitecaps FC non-playing staff
Vancouver Whitecaps FC coaches
Capilano University alumni
Association football midfielders
English expatriate sportspeople in the United States
Expatriate soccer players in the United States
English expatriate footballers
English expatriate sportspeople in Canada
Expatriate soccer players in Canada
1973 births